Lies My Teacher Told Me: Everything Your American History Textbook Got Wrong was written by James W. Loewen in 1995 and critically examines twelve popular American high school history textbooks. In the book, Loewen concludes that the textbook authors propagate false, Eurocentric, and mythologized views of American history. In addition to his critique of the dominant historical themes presented in high school textbooks, Loewen presents themes from history that he believes should be presented in high school textbooks.

Themes
In Lies My Teacher Told Me, Loewen criticizes modern American high school history textbooks for containing incorrect information about people and events such as Christopher Columbus, the lies and inaccuracies in the history books regarding the dealings between the Europeans and the Native Americans, and their often deceptive and inaccurate teachings told about America's commerce in slavery. He further criticizes the texts for a tendency to avoid controversy and for their "bland" and simplistic style. He proposes that when American history textbooks elevate American historical figures to the status of heroes, they unintentionally give students the impression that these figures are super-humans who live in the irretrievable past. Rather than highlighting both the positives and negatives of historical figures, Loewen claims textbooks cause students to perceive these figures through a single lens. Loewen asserts that the muting of past clashes and tragedies makes history boring to students, especially groups excluded from the positive histories.

Sources
The twelve textbooks Loewen examined for the first edition are:
 The American Adventure (Allyn & Bacon, 1975)
 American Adventures (Steck-Vaughn, 1987)
 American History (Harcourt Brace Jovanovich, 1982)
 The American Pageant (D. C. Heath and Company, 1991)
 The American Tradition (Charles E. Merrill Publishing, 1984)
 The American Way (Holt, Rinehart and Winston, 1979)
 The Challenge of Freedom (Glencoe, 1990)
 Discovering American History (Holt, Rinehart and Winston, 1974)
 Land of Promise (Scott, Foresman, 1983)
 Life and Liberty (Scott, Foresman, 1984)
 Triumph of the American Nation (Harcourt Brace Jovanovich, 1986)
 The United States: A History of the Republic (Prentice Hall, 1991)

In the second edition, Loewen added a newer edition of The American Pageant and five additional textbooks:
 The American Pageant (Houghton Mifflin, 2006)
 The American Journey (Glencoe/McGraw-Hill, 2000)
 The Americans (McDougal Littell, 2007)
 America: Pathways to the Present (Prentice Hall, 2005)
 A History of the United States (McDougal Littell, 2005)
 Holt American Nation (Holt, Rinehart, and Winston, 2003)

Editions
There are three distinct editions of the book. For the original 1995 edition, Loewen examined twelve textbooks. For the 2007 edition, he revised the text to address five additional textbooks and a new edition of one of the earlier textbooks examined. The 2018 edition retains the same text as the 2007 edition, adding a new preface, "The age of alternative facts".  In April 2019, Loewen and Rebecca Stefoff, known for her adaptation of Howard Zinn's 1980 bestseller A People's History of the United States for young readers, made Lies My Teacher Told Me accessible for younger readers in Lies My Teacher Told Me: Young Readers Edition (The New Press, 2019).

Reception
Lies My Teacher Told Me is the winner of the 1996 American Book Award, the Oliver Cromwell Cox Award for Distinguished Anti-Racist Scholarship, and the Critics Choice Award of the American Educational Studies Association. Although well received by many, critic Jere T. Humphreys notes that Loewen's implicit bias may have caused him to fail to highlight some of the positive contributions made toward improving equality in the United States. For example, when referencing the Civil Rights Movement, Loewen falls short in crediting the efforts of the U.S. legislative and executive branches in aiding throughout the Civil Rights struggle.

See also 
 Lies Across America, a 1999 book on historical markers by the same author

References

External links
 
 Booknotes interview with Loewen on Lies, March 26, 1995.

1995 non-fiction books
20th-century history books
Curricula
English-language books
Eurocentrism
History books about the United States
History education
Textbook controversies
Historical revisionism
Books about education
The New Press books
American Book Award-winning works
Education controversies in the United States